Donald K. Muchow (born October 20, 1937) is a former rear admiral and Chief of Chaplains of the United States Navy.

Biography
Muchow was born on October 20, 1937 in Framingham, Massachusetts. He graduated from Concordia Senior College and Concordia Theological Seminary. In 1960, he married Monie Eberhard. They have two children.

Career
Later, he was stationed at Marine Corps Air Station Cherry Point and Marine Corps Base Camp Lejeune.

After serving with Destroyer Squadron 22, Muchow was stationed at Naval Hospital Philadelphia. Muchow then served aboard the  before being transferred to the 9th Marine Regiment in Japan. Later, he was assigned to the Rapid Deployment Joint Task Force and the United States Central Command.

Muchow was Deputy Chief of Chaplains from 1991 until 1994, when he became Chief of Chaplains. He remained in the position until his retirement in 1997.

Awards he received during his career include the Navy Distinguished Service Medal, the Defense Superior Service Medal and the Legion of Merit.

References

People from Framingham, Massachusetts
Military personnel from Massachusetts
Chiefs of Chaplains of the United States Navy
20th-century American Lutheran clergy
Recipients of the Navy Distinguished Service Medal
Recipients of the Defense Superior Service Medal
Recipients of the Legion of Merit
Concordia Theological Seminary alumni
1937 births
Living people